Vossia may refer to:

Vossia (plant), a genus of grass in the family Poaceae
Vossia (katydid), a genus of bush crickets or katydids in the family Tettigoniidae, subfamily Phaneropterinae